In mathematical representation theory, a (Zuckerman) translation functor is a functor taking representations of a Lie algebra to representations with a possibly different central character. Roughly speaking, the functor is given by taking a tensor product with a finite-dimensional representation, and then taking a subspace with some central character.

Definition

By the Harish-Chandra isomorphism, the characters of the center Z of the universal enveloping algebra of a complex reductive Lie algebra can be identified with the points of L⊗C/W, where L is the weight lattice and W is the Weyl group. If λ is a point of L⊗C/W then write χλ for the corresponding character of Z.

A representation of the Lie algebra is said to have central character  χλ if every vector v is a generalized eigenvector of the center Z with eigenvalue  χλ; in other words if z∈Z and v∈V then (z −  χλ(z))n(v)=0 for some n.

The translation functor ψ takes representations V with central character  χλ to representations with central character  χμ. It is constructed in two steps:
First take the tensor product of V with an irreducible finite dimensional representation with extremal weight λ−μ (if one exists).
Then take the generalized eigenspace of this with eigenvalue χμ.

References

Representation theory
Functors